Uncial 0234 (in the Gregory-Aland numbering), ε 49 (von Soden), is a Greek uncial manuscript of the New Testament. Paleographically it has been assigned to the 8th century.

Description 
The codex contains two small parts of the Matthew 28:11-15; John 1:4-8,20-24, on two parchment leaves (24 cm by 21 cm). Written in two columns per page, 30 lines per page, in uncial letters.

Gospel of John follows Matthew immediately (western order). 

Currently it is dated by the INTF to the 8th century.

Formerly the codex was held at the Qubbat al-Khazna  in Damascus. The present location of the codex is unknown. Currently the manuscript is not accessible.

The manuscript was added to the list of the New Testament manuscripts by Kurt Aland in 1954.

Text 
The Greek text of this codex is a representative of the Alexandrian text-type. Aland placed it in Category II.

See also 

 List of New Testament uncials
 Textual criticism

References

Further reading 

 Hermann von Soden, "Sitzungsberichte der preussischen Akademie der Wissenschaften" 39 (Berlin, 1903), pp. 825-930. 

Greek New Testament uncials
8th-century biblical manuscripts